This is a list of the ministers who have served in John Kufuor's New Patriotic Party government during the Fourth Republic of Ghana. This government started on January 7, 2001, the first changeover between civilian governments in Ghana through the ballot box. John Kufuor won the 2004 elections and served his second term of office ending January 2009.

List of ministers of state (2001–2005)

NB. There was a cabinet reshuffle on April 1, 2003.

List of ministers of state (2005–2009)

There was a cabinet reshuffle on 28 April 2006.
There was a second cabinet reshuffle to release ministers with presidential ambitions in July 2007.

See also
New Patriotic Party

References

History of Ghana
Politics of Ghana
Governments of Ghana
2001 establishments in Ghana
2009 disestablishments in Africa
2009 in Ghana